Sarah Mason may refer to:

 Sarah Y. Mason (1896–1980), American screenwriter and script supervisor
 Sarah Mason (novelist) (born 1971), British romance novelist
 Sarah Mason (actress) (born 1983), American actress and former model
 Sarah Mason (surfer) (born 1995), New Zealand-born surfer
 Sarah Mason (Jericho character), a fictional character

See also
 Sara Mason (disambiguation)